Lars-Åke Andersson is a former international speedway rider from Sweden. He is not to be confused with Åke Andersson, another Swedish international rider from the same time period.

Speedway career 
Andersson won a bronze medal at the Speedway World Team Cup in the 1976 Speedway World Team Cup.

World final appearances

World Team Cup
 1976 –  London, White City Stadium (with Bernt Persson / Anders Michanek / Bengt Jansson / Christer Löfqvist) – 3rd – 26pts

References 

Swedish speedway riders
Possibly living people
Year of birth missing